Maxim Anatolievich Sokolov (born 27 May 1972 in Leningrad, Russian SFSR, Soviet Union) is a professional ice hockey goalie currently playing for SKA Saint Petersburg of the Kontinental Hockey League (KHL).

External links

1972 births
Living people
Avangard Omsk players
Metallurg Novokuznetsk players
Ice hockey players at the 2006 Winter Olympics
Olympic ice hockey players of Russia
Russian ice hockey goaltenders
Severstal Cherepovets players
SKA Saint Petersburg players
Ice hockey people from Saint Petersburg